Speed to fly is a principle used by soaring pilots when flying between sources of lift, usually thermals, ridge lift and wave.  The aim is to maximize the average cross-country speed by optimizing the airspeed in both rising and sinking air.  The optimal airspeed is independent of the wind speed, because the fastest average speed achievable through the airmass corresponds to the fastest achievable average groundspeed.

The speed to fly is the optimum speed through sinking or rising air mass to achieve either the furthest glide, or fastest average cross-country speed.

Most speed to fly setups use units of either airspeed in kilometers per hour (km/h) and climb rate in meters per second (m/s), or airspeed in knots (kn) and climb rate in feet per minute (ft/min).

History 
The idea is usually attributed to Paul MacCready, although an early version of the theory was first described by Wolfgang Späte in 1938.
However Späte may not have considered sinking air between thermals, and there is no mention of this  until 1947 when Ernest Dewing and George Pirie independently included this aspect. 

In 1954, Paul MacCready described an Optimum Airspeed Selector, that he had been using since 1947.   According to MacCready, the crosscountry airspeed selector is "a simple device that indicates the optimum speed at which a sailplane should be flown between thermals.  On a day with weak thermals and weak downcurrents, a pilot should fly between thermals at a velocity near that for best gliding angle of the sailplane...If the next thermal to be encountered is expected to be strong, the pilot should dive toward it at high velocity in order to reach it as fast as possible.  Note the magnitude of the wind is of no concern when considering thermals which move with the air mass.  For the derivation of the airspeed selector one minimizes the time for the sailplane to reach a thermal and regain the original height."

According to Bob Wander, "The principal advantage of making a rotatable speed-to-fly ring for your total energy variometer is that cross-country speeds in gliding can be optimized when we factor the strength of thermals into the speed-to-fly process.  For instance, when thermals are weak, then it pays to fly conservatively...minimum sinking speed...We are able to cruise faster between thermals when lift is strong because it is so easy to get altitude back in strong lift".

Instrumentation
The minimal instrumentation required is an airspeed indicator and a variometer. The pilot will use the polar curve information for the particular glider to derive the exact speeds to fly, minimum sink or maximum L/D, depending on the lift and sink conditions in which the glider is flying.  A speed to fly ring (known as a 'MacCready Ring'), which is fitted around the aircraft's variometer, will indicate the optimum airspeed to fly between thermals for maximum crosscountry performance.  The ring is usually calibrated in either knots or meters per second and its markings are based on the aircraft's polar curve.  During the glide between thermals, the index arrow is set at the rate of climb expected in the next thermal. On the speed ring, the variometer needle points to the optimum speed to fly between thermals.

Electronic versions of the MacCready Ring are built into glide computers that will give audible warnings to the pilot to speed up or slow down. Similar facilities can also be built into a PDA.  The computer is connected to sensors that detect the aircraft's airspeed and rate of sink.  If linked to a GPS, and using a computed or manual estimate of the windspeed, the glide computer can also calculate the speed and altitude necessary to glide to a particular destination.  This glide is known as the final glide because no further lift should be necessary to reach the goal.  During this glide, speed to fly information is needed to ensure that the remaining height is used efficiently.

See also 
 Geoffrey H. Stephenson
 ICAO recommendations on use of the International System of Units

References

External links
 Performance Airspeeds for the Soaring Challenged by Jim D. Burch (mirror of defunct original page via avia.tion.ca)
 MacCready Theory with Uncertain Lift and Limited Altitude Paper from  Technical Soaring 23 (3) (July  1999) 88-96, by John H. Cochrane
 Just a little faster, please (new version, 2007) paper by John H. Cochrane
 The Price You Pay for McCready Speeds by Wil Schuemann, from the Proceedings of the 1972 Soaring Symposium 
 Competition Philosophy by Dick Johnson, from the Proceedings of the 1972 Soaring Symposium
 Introduction to Cross Country Soaring by Kai Gersten, 1999 (Revised 2006)
 This Brilliant Man Can Get You In Trouble – Misapply MacCready Theory At Your Own Peril by Clemens Ceipek, 2021

Airspeed
Gliding technology